An aftershock is a small-magnitude earthquake that occurs after a larger earthquake.

Aftershock may also refer to:

Film and television 
 Aftershock (1990 film), a film directed by Frank Harris
 Aftershock, alternative title of the 1992 TV movie Quake
 Aftershock (2008 film), a New Zealand telemovie starring Sarah Peirse
 Aftershock (2010 film), a film directed by Feng Xiaogang and based on the 1976 Tangshan earthquake
 Aftershock (2012 film), a horror-thriller film directed by Nicolás López
 Aftershock (2022 film), a documentary film
 Black Scorpion II: Aftershock, a 1997 comedy-action film
 Aftershock, a villain from the TV series Black Scorpion and film Black Scorpion II: Aftershock
 Aftershock: Earthquake in New York, a 1999 American TV miniseries
 "Aftershock" (Law & Order), a 1996 episode of Law & Order

Music 
 Aftershock (band), an American metalcore band
 Aftershock (Average White Band album)
 Aftershock (Forty Foot Echo album)
 Aftershock (Motörhead album)
 Aftershock, an album by Amy Pearson
 Aftershock, an album by Aphrodite
 "Aftershock" (Cash Cash song)
 "Aftershock", a song by Demi Lovato from the Japanese deluxe edition of Unbroken and the Give Your Heart a Break EP
 "Aftershock", a song by Anthrax from Spreading the Disease
 "Aftershock", a song by Van Halen from Balance
 "Aftershocks", a song from the musical Next to Normal

Sports 
 Long Beach Aftershock, a women's professional football team
 Los Angeles Aftershock, a team in the Continental Basketball Association
 Shreveport Aftershock, a team in the Independent Women's Football League

Other uses 
 Aftershocks (book), memoir by Nadia Owusu
 Aftershock Comics, an American comic book publisher
 Aftershock (comics), a Marvel Comics character
 Aftershock (roller coaster), a roller coaster at Silverwood Theme Park in Athol, Idaho
 UFO: Aftershock, a 2005 computer game
 WWE Aftershock, a 2005 professional wrestling video game
 Aftershocks (play), a 1993 play by Australian playwright Paul Brown